The 1878–79 season was the sixth Scottish football season in which Dumbarton competed at a national level.

Scottish Cup

Dumbarton reached the sixth round of the Scottish Cup before losing out to their local rivals, Vale of Leven - who went on to retain the cup for the third successive year.

Friendlies

During the season, 10 'friendly' matches were played, including home and away fixtures against local rivals Renton, and a home game against the holders of the Ayrshire Cup, Mauchline. Of these matches, 8 were won and 2 drawn, scoring 36 goals and conceding 7.

Player statistics

Of note amongst those donning the club's colours for the first time was Robert 'Sparrow' Brown.

Only includes appearances and goals in competitive Scottish Cup matches.

Source:

References

Dumbarton F.C. seasons
Scottish football clubs 1878–79 season